Steffen Kienle (born 18 January 1995) is a German footballer who plays as a striker for VfR Aalen.

References

External links 
 

1995 births
Living people
German footballers
Association football forwards
VfR Aalen players
SSV Ulm 1846 players
3. Liga players
Regionalliga players